Abu Taher Khan (born 23 November 1964) is an Indian Bengali politician, agriculturalist and social worker from Murshidabad. He was former Legislator and is the current Member of Parliament from the Murshidabad (Lok Sabha constituency) representing the All India Trinamool Congress.

Early life and education
Khan was born in 1963 to Bengali Muslim parents in Naoda, Murshidabad district. His father was Barkatullah Khan and his mother was Sabijan Bewa. In 1980, he passed his 8th/Madhyamik under the West Bengal Board of Secondary Education from Hareknagar MMCVP in Beldanga. Khan married Tanuja Khanum, and has two sons. The family also have a home in New Delhi, the country's capital.

Career
Khan's political career began when he stood up as an Indian National Congress candidate for the Naoda (Vidhan Sabha constituency) during the 2001 West Bengal Legislative Assembly elections. Khan kept this seat for 18 years, as he was able to win the elections of 2006, 2011 and 2016.

In 2019, Khan gave up his seat at the West Bengal Legislative Assembly to contest in the 2019 Indian general election for the entire Murshidabad as an All India Trinamool Congress candidate. He successfully won the seat, defeating Abu Hena by 226417 votes, and officially became a Member of the Indian Parliament.

References

Indian National Congress politicians from West Bengal
Members of the West Bengal Legislative Assembly
Living people
India MPs 2019–present
1963 births
21st-century Bengalis
20th-century Bengalis
People from Murshidabad district